Slovenia, represented by the Slovenian Olympic Committee (Olimpijski komite Slovenije, abbreviated OKS), sent a team with 62 athletes to compete in 11 sports at the 2008 Summer Olympics in Beijing, People's Republic of China. The flag on the opening ceremony was held by Slovenian judoka Urška Žolnir, who was bronze in 2004 Olympics Judo Competition.

Medalists 

Notes
Primož Kozmus wins the first ever Olympic track and field gold medal for independent Slovenia.
Sara Isakovič wins the first swimming medal and reaches first women's swimming finals in independent Slovenia.
Rajmond Debevec was ranked fourth before the last shot, but a mistake by the U.S. competitor and then-leader Matt Emmons allowed for Debevec to attain the bronze medal.

Athletics

Men
Track & road events

* Damjan Zlatnar did not compete in the quarterfinal round of the men's 110 metre hurdles because of Achilles' tendon injury.

Field events

Combined events – Decathlon

Women
Track & road events

Field events

Badminton

Canoeing

Slalom

Sprint

Qualification Legend: QS = Qualify to semi-final; QF = Qualify directly to final

Cycling

Road

Mountain biking

Gymnastics

Artistic
Men

Women

Judo

Men

Women

Rowing

Men

Qualification Legend: FA=Final A (medal); FB=Final B (non-medal); FC=Final C (non-medal); FD=Final D (non-medal); FE=Final E (non-medal); FF=Final F (non-medal); SA/B=Semifinals A/B; SC/D=Semifinals C/D; SE/F=Semifinals E/F; QF=Quarterfinals; R=Repechage

Sailing

Men

Women

Open

M = Medal race; EL = Eliminated – did not advance into the medal race; CAN = Race cancelled

Shooting

Men

Swimming

Men

* Luka Turk withdrew from the Games because of injury.

Women

Table tennis

See also
 Slovenia at the 2008 Summer Paralympics

References 

Nations at the 2008 Summer Olympics
2008
Summer Olympics